Wikstroemia parviflora is a shrub in the family Thymelaeaceae.  It is native to China, specifically Gansu.

Description
The shrub grows up to 0.2 to 0.5 m tall. Its branches are gray and densely crowded. It is often found on dry shrubby slopes and roadsides at altitudes of 1000 to 2000 m.

References

parviflora